The Miss Universo Italia 2011 pageant was held on June 30, 2011. The winner was Elisa Torrini, contestant of Lazio; she will represent Italy at Miss Universe 2011, which will take place in Brazil on September 12, 2011.

Results

Placements

Delegates

Judges
The following celebrities judged the final competition
Nina Morić, Croatian model, who work in Italy
Sarodj Bertin, Miss Haiti Universe 2010
Lory del Santo, Italian actress and showgirl;
Marco Balestri, Italian television writer and radio host
Veridiana Mallmann, Italian-Brazilian showgirl, ex velina
Francesca Cipriani, Italian showgirl, winner of the Italian reality "La pupa e il secchione 2"
Angelo Rizzo, Italian film director
Enzo Odoguardi, Italian producer
Yulame Rodriguez del Rey, showgirl
Giulio Cesare Senatore, Italian entrepreneur
Antonio Impagliazzo, Italian entrepreneur
Umberto Lucio Amore, Italian entrepreneur

Entertainment
Flavia Vento, Italian showgirl
Francesco Paoloantoni, Italian comic
Tony Colombo, Neapolitan singer
Carmen Masola, singer; winner of "Italia's Got Talent"

External links
http://www.missuniverseitaly.it/
 Miss Universe Organization official website

Miss Universo Italia
2011 beauty pageants
2011 in Italy